Vienna Island is a forested bar island in Wood County, West Virginia on the Ohio River. The island lies off the shore from Vienna, West Virginia from which it takes its name.

See also 
List of islands of West Virginia

River islands of West Virginia
Islands of Wood County, West Virginia
Islands of the Ohio River